Hesar-e Garmkhan (also Romanized as Ḩeşār-e Garmkhān; also known as Ḩeşār and Heşār) is a city in Garmkhan District, Bojnord County, North Khorasan Province, Iran. At the 2006 census, its population was 716, in 182 families.

References 

Populated places in Bojnord County
Cities in North Khorasan Province